This is a list of episodes of Harvey Girls Forever!, the American animated web television series targeted at female kids ages 9 to 14. It is about Little Audrey, whose preteen life makes friends with Little Dot, Little Lotta and Richie Rich, produced by DreamWorks Animation. It premiered on Netflix on June 29, 2018.

Series overview

Episodes

Season 1 (2018)

Season 2 (2019)

Season 3 (2019)

Season 4 (2020)

Notes

References

Lists of American children's animated television series episodes